Üzümlü is a village in the Çukurca District in Hakkâri Province in Turkey. The village is populated by Kurds of the Pinyanişî tribe and had a population of 1,391 in 2022.

The unpopulated hamlet of Balkaya is attached to Üzümlü.

Population 
Population history of the village from 2007 to 2022:

References 

Kurdish settlements in Hakkâri Province
Villages in Çukurca District